Netball at the 2003 Pacific Games in Suva, Fiji was held from 28 June to 12 July 2003.

Results

Pool A

Pool B

Semi-finals

Consolation matches

7th/8th playoff

5th/6th playoff

Bronze-medal match

Gold-medal match

Final standings

See also
 Netball at the Pacific Games

References

2003 South Pacific Games
South Pacific Games
Netball at the Pacific Games
South Pacific